Paul Savoie (born May 21, 1946) is a Canadian actor from Quebec. He is most noted for his performance in the 2015 film The Diary of an Old Man (Le Journal d’un vieil homme), for which he was a Prix Iris nominee for Best Actor at the 18th Quebec Cinema Awards in 2016, and won the award for Best Performance in a Borsos Competition Film at the Whistler Film Festival.

Filmography

Films

Television

References

1946 births
Living people
Canadian male television actors
Canadian male film actors
French Quebecers
Male actors from Quebec